The Rainbow Bridge is an old bridge over Brush Creek approximately two miles west of Riverton, Kansas on former U.S. Route 66 (US-66), now a county road. The bridge is a single-span concrete Marsh arch bridge and is the sole surviving bridge of this type on the entire length of the former highway. Two other Marsh arch bridges were also located on US-66 in Kansas, both over the Spring River. It was built in 1923.

The bridge has often been covered with graffiti, but was recently re-painted white. The bridge has been placed on the National Register of Historic Places (as the Brush Creek Bridge) on March 10, 1983, due to its connection with US-66 and is also a Kansas state landmark. In 2014, Kansas Rt. 66 Historic Byway nominated a bypassed  section of original 1926 highway, which ran south from the Brush Creek to the Willow Creek bridge near Baxter Springs, for an NRHP listing.

The bridge is fairly narrow, and due to traffic on the road, a replacement bridge has been built. The road curves toward the new bridge toward Baxter Springs, but a short, one-way road carries traffic to the Rainbow Bridge, which may still be crossed. This was part of a compromise after a disagreement between the county and the Kansas Route 66 Association as federal funds used for construction of the new bridge required demolition of the old. The bridge had been listed with the National Register, which prohibited condemnation of the old bridge.

In the year 2000, country singer Brad Paisley performed "Route 66" on the bridge for the TLC special, "Route 66: Main Street America".

See also
 
 
 
 
 List of bridges on the National Register of Historic Places in Kansas
 National Register of Historic Places listings in Cherokee County, Kansas

References

External links

Bridges completed in 1923
Road bridges on the National Register of Historic Places in Kansas
Bridges on U.S. Route 66
Buildings and structures in Cherokee County, Kansas
Through arch bridges in the United States
Concrete bridges in the United States
U.S. Route 66 in Kansas
Bridges of the United States Numbered Highway System
National Register of Historic Places in Cherokee County, Kansas
1923 establishments in Kansas